William Molineux (c. 1713 – October 22, 1774) was a hardware merchant in colonial Boston of Irish descent best known for his role in the Boston Tea Party of 1773 and earlier political protests

Molineux was unusual among the Boston Whigs in having been born in England and emigrating to Massachusetts. He was also not part of the province's Congregationalist orthodoxy, attending an Anglican church and reportedly dabbling with deist views. Insurance records show that Molineux broke British trade laws in his business by sending ships to the Dutch Republic, so he might have been motivated to join the radical cause by increased customs duties and enforcement in the 1760s. Colleagues like John Adams described him as a volatile man.

Molineux rose to prominence leading committees and crowds in demonstrations against the Townshend Acts, seizures by customs officers, and the stationing of British troops in Boston. He also organized a public works effort to employ the town's poor at spinning and weaving linen. With Doctor Thomas Young he was one of the most radical among the genteel Whig organizers who sought to steer public demonstrations in Boston after 1765. For example, on January 18, 1770, he advocated a march on acting governor Thomas Hutchinson's mansion despite warnings that such an act against the king's representative was tantamount to treason, and reportedly threatened to kill himself if his colleagues did not agree.

Molineux was the only top Whig organizer not in Old South Meeting House on the night of the Tea Party, meaning he was probably at the dock observing the destruction of the tea. In 1774 he set an example by refusing jury duty under royal judges and may have helped to gather field artillery for the province. However, in late October, he suddenly became ill, and on October 22 he died, reportedly saying, "O save my Country, Heaven."

Conflicting rumors circulated. The working-class Whigs who followed Molineux suggested he had been poisoned by British army officers. Friends of the royal government said he had committed suicide after being caught embezzling for the linen project from a New York merchant whose affairs he represented. His estate was in debt to that man, but Molineux may have died of entirely natural causes.

Because Molineux died before the American Revolutionary War began, and because some of his colleagues were uncomfortable with his radical methods, he was largely omitted in histories of America's independence. In fact, his name was preserved most prominently in a short story by Nathaniel Hawthorne titled "My Kinsman, Major Molineux," set in the 1740s, in which the title character is a victim, not a leader, of a Boston crowd. Molineux's home on Beacon Hill, Boston, Massachusetts was torn down to make room for the Massachusetts State House.

He is a featured character in the 2012 video game, Assassin's Creed III.

References

Bibliography
 Bell, J. L. "William Molineux, Forgotten Revolutionary"
 Tyler, John W. Smugglers & Patriots: Boston Merchants and the Advent of the American Revolution. Boston: Northeastern University Press, 1986. .
 New England Magazine, Volume 9.

External links
 

1717 births
1774 deaths
Colonial American merchants
Colonial American smugglers
Patriots in the American Revolution
People from colonial Boston
People of Massachusetts in the American Revolution
Huguenot participants in the American Revolution
Kingdom of England emigrants to Massachusetts Bay Colony
People from Beacon Hill, Boston